Becky Price (born September 8, 1974 in Richmond Hill, Ontario) is a former field hockey forward from Canada, who earned a total number of 39 international caps for the Canadian National Team during her career. She started playing field hockey in high school, and was named York University's Female Athlete of the Year in 1998.

International senior tournaments
 2001 – Pan American Cup, Kingston, Jamaica (3rd)
 2001 – World Cup Qualifier, Amiens/Abbeville, France (10th)
 2002 – Commonwealth Games, Manchester, UK (7th)

External links
 Profile on Field Hockey Canada

Canadian female field hockey players
Sportspeople from Ontario
York University alumni
Field hockey players at the 2002 Commonwealth Games
1974 births
Living people
Commonwealth Games competitors for Canada